Modernity and the Holocaust is a 1989 book by Zygmunt Bauman published by Polity Press. As the title implies, it explores the relationship between modernity and The Holocaust.

The book has been seen as a criticism of modernity, as one of Bauman's arguments is that it was modernity that led to The Holocaust, and that despite several decades passing, the modernity has not yet come to terms with this tragedy.

Contents 
Bauman's most famous book, Modernity and the Holocaust, is an attempt to give a full account of the dangers of fear of "the stranger". Drawing upon Hannah Arendt and Theodor Adorno's books on totalitarianism and the Enlightenment, Bauman developed the argument that the Holocaust should not simply be considered to be an event in Jewish history, nor a regression to pre-modern barbarism. Rather, he argued, the Holocaust should be seen as deeply connected to modernity and its order-making efforts. Procedural rationality, the division of labour into smaller and smaller tasks, the taxonomic categorisation of different species, and the tendency to view obedience to rules as morally good, all played their role in the Holocaust coming to pass. He argued that for this reason modern societies have not fully grasped the lessons of the Holocaust; it tends to be viewed—to use Bauman's metaphor—like a picture hanging on the wall, offering few lessons. In Bauman's analysis the Jews became 'strangers' par excellence in Europe. The Final Solution was pictured by him as an extreme example of the attempt made by society to excise the uncomfortable and indeterminate elements that exist within it. Bauman, like the philosopher Giorgio Agamben, contended that the same processes of exclusion that were at work in the Holocaust could, and to an extent do, still come into play today.

Reception 
Moishe Postone reviewed the book for the American Journal of Sociology in 1992. He called the book "important and thought-provoking", although he also argued that "several aspects of [Bauman's] book are problematic" or "puzzling". He concluded that despite some issues, the book "represents an important contribution to contemporary sociological thought".

A. Dirk Moses while reviewing Omer Bartov's book Murder in Our Midst: The Holocaust, Industrial Killing, and Representation for the Australian Journal of Politics & History in 2008, noted that Bartov's work has been influenced by Bauman's.

Awards 

 European Amalfi Prize for Sociology and Social Sciences (1989)

References

External links 
 
 

1989 non-fiction books
Books about the Holocaust
Sociology books
Modernity